Gemini was a submarine communications cable system privately owned by Gemini SCSL linking the United States and the UK via parallel north and south routes.  The installation of the system was a joint venture between Cable & Wireless and WorldCom Inc.  The cable system was considered operational in 1998.  The cable system was approximately 12600 km combined between its north and south routes, with landing stations in Charlestown, Rhode Island; Oxwich Bay, Wales; Manasquan, New Jersey; and Porthcurno, England.

The cable was decommissioned in 2004, because the terminal transmission technology became obsolete.  Portions of the cable were recovered for redeployment for the HUGO cable system.  Additional pieces of the Gemini cable were reused in systems connecting Bermuda, Tortola and Jamaica to the United States.

References

1998 establishments in Rhode Island
1998 establishments in Wales
1998 establishments in New Jersey
1998 establishments in England
2004 disestablishments in England
2004 disestablishments in New Jersey
2004 disestablishments in Wales
2004 disestablishments in Rhode Island